Liga Deportiva Universitaria de Quito —often referred to as LDU Quito, Liga de Quito, or simply la Liga— is a professional football club based in Quito, Ecuador. The first international cup they took part of was the Copa Libertadores in 1970 as the champion of Ecuador. Since then, they have taken part in the Copa CONMEBOL, Copa Sudamericana, Recopa Sudamericana, Suruga Bank Championship, and the FIFA Club World Cup.

LDU Quito had the most success in the Recopa Sudamericana, winning back-to-back titles in 2009 and 2010. Their participation in the Recopa was achieved by winning the 2008 Copa Libertadores and the 2009 Copa Sudamericana. LDU Quito is the first, and to date only, Ecuadorian club to win any of the aforementioned tournaments.

In the tables, (H) denotes home ground, (A) denotes away ground, and (N) symbolizes neutral ground. The first score is always LDU Quito's.

Copa Libertadores
The Copa Libertadores was inaugurated in 1960, and LDU Quito first participated in 1970. They reached the semifinals in consecutive seasons in 1975 and 1976. After sporadic participation in the 1980s and 1990s, Liga became a regular participant in the 2000s. They won the competition in 2008, becoming the first Ecuadorian club to win the competition or any international title.

Copa Sudamericana
The Copa Sudamericana was inaugurated in 2002 and Liga first participated in 2003. They have been regular participants since then. They hold the record with most semifinals appearances, with four (2004, 2009, 2010, 2011). Liga won the competition in 2009 for their third international title.

Copa CONMEBOL
The Copa CONMEBOL was inaugurated in 1992 and lasted until 1999. Liga only participated in one edition (1998). They were eliminated in the second round by eventual champion Santos.

Recopa Sudamericana
The Recopa Sudamericana was inaugurated 1989, and again in 2003. It is contested between the winners of the Copa Libertadores and Copa Sudamericana. Liga participated in consecutive season in 2009 and 2010 as the 2008 Copa Libertadores and 2009 Copa Sudamericana champion, respectively. Liga won both editions and are currently the second most successful club in the competition, and one of three clubs to win back-to-back titles.

Copa Suruga Bank
The Copa Suruga Bank was inaugurated in 2008 and is contested between the winners of the Copa Sudamericana and the J.League Cup. Liga's only participation came in 2010 as the 2009 Copa Sudamericana champion. Lost their only match in a penalty shoot-out.

FIFA Club World Cup
The FIFA Club World Cup is an international club competition between the seasons' winner of each continental club championship, inaugurated in 2000. Liga's only participation came in 2008 as that year's Copa Libertadores champion. They finished as the runner-up to the European champions, Manchester United.

Overall record

Updated as of the end of 2022.

References

External links

L.D.U. Quito